McCollum Peak is a peak,  high, standing south of Beascochea Bay  southeast of Mount Waugh, on the west coast of Graham Land, Antarctica. It was first charted by the Fourth French Antarctic Expedition under Jean-Baptiste Charcot, 1908–10, and was named by the UK Antarctic Place-Names Committee in 1959 for Elmer V. McCollum, an American biochemist who first isolated vitamins A and B, in 1915.

References
Citations

Sources
 

Mountains of Graham Land
Graham Coast